Six Months Is a Long Time is the third studio album by Norwegian indie rock band Kakkmaddafakka. It was released on June 28, 2013. The album's cover art is the painting Portrait of Emma Jane Hodges, a work of the painter Charles Howard Hodges, dated 1815.

Track listing
"Young" – 3:21
"Someone New" – 3:02
"Lie" – 3:54
"Forever Alone" – 4:16
"Saviour" – 3:05
"Bill Clinton" – 3:44
"No Song" – 2:43
"Female Dyslexic" – 2:58
"Never Friends" – 4:53
"Gangsta No More" – 3:28
"All About You" – 5:05

References

Kakkmaddafakka albums
2013 albums